Prānāyāma (Sanskrit: प्राणायाम) is the yogic practice of focusing on breath. In Sanskrit, prana means "vital life force", and yama means to gain control. In yoga, breath is associated with prana, thus, pranayama is a means to elevate the prana shakti, or life energies. Pranayama is described in Hindu texts such as the Bhagavad Gita and the Yoga Sutras of Patanjali. Later in Hatha yoga texts, it meant the complete suspension of breathing.

Etymology
Prāṇāyāma is a Sanskrit compound. It is defined variously by different authors.

Macdonell gives the etymology as prana, breath, + āyāma and defines it as the suspension of breath.

There are other processes of prāṇāyāma besides this three-step model.

V. S. Apte's definition of  derives it from  +  and provides several variant meanings for it when used in compounds.  The first three meanings have to do with "length", "expansion, extension", and "stretching, extending", but in the specific case of use in the compound  he defines  as meaning "restrain, control, stopping".

Ramamurti Mishra gives the definition:

Hinduism

Bhagavad Gītā

Pranayama is mentioned in verse 4.29 of the Bhagavad Gītā, which states "Still others, who are inclined to the process of breath restraint to remain in trance, practice by offering the movement of the outgoing breath into the incoming, and the incoming breath into the outgoing, and thus at last remain in trance, stopping all breathing. Others, curtailing the eating process, offer the outgoing breath into itself as a sacrifice."

Yoga Sutras of Patanjali

Pranayama is the fourth "limb" of the eight limbs of Ashtanga Yoga mentioned in verse 2.29 in the Yoga Sutras of Patanjali. Patanjali, a Hindu Rishi, discusses his specific approach to pranayama in verses 2.49 through 2.51, and devotes verses 2.52 and 2.53 to explaining the benefits of the practice. Patanjali does not fully elucidate the nature of prana, and the theory and practice of pranayama seem to have undergone significant development after him. He presents pranayama as essentially an exercise that is preliminary to concentration.

Yoga teachers including B. K. S. Iyengar have advised that pranayama should be part of an overall practice that includes the other limbs of Patanjali's Raja Yoga teachings, especially Yama, Niyama, and Asana.

Hatha yoga
The Indian tradition of Hatha Yoga makes use of various pranayama techniques. The 15th century Hatha Yoga Pradipika is a key text of this tradition and includes various forms of pranayama such as Kumbhaka breath retention and various body locks (Bandhas). Other forms of pranayama breathing include Ujjayi breath ("Victorious Breath"), Sitali (breathing through the rolled tongue), Bhastrika ("Bellows Breath"), Kapalabhati ("Skull-shining Breath", a Shatkarma purification), Surya Bhedana ("Sun-piercing Breath"), and the soothing Bhramari (buzzing like a bee).
B. K. S. Iyengar cautions that pranayama should only be undertaken when one has a firmly established yoga practice and then only under the guidance of an experienced Guru.

According to the scholar-practitioner of yoga Theos Bernard, the ultimate aim of pranayama is the suspension of breathing (kevala kumbhaka), "causing the mind to swoon". Paramahansa Yogananda writes, "The real meaning of Pranayama, according to Patanjali, the founder of Yoga philosophy, is the gradual cessation of breathing, the discontinuance of inhalation and exhalation".

Yoga as exercise

The yoga scholar Andrea Jain states that pranayama was "marginal to the most widely cited sources" before the 20th century, and that the breathing practices were "dramatically" unlike the modern ones; she writes that while pranayama in modern yoga as exercise consists of synchronising the breath with movements (between asanas), in texts like the Bhagavad Gita and the Yoga Sutras of Patanjali, pranayama meant "complete cessation of breathing", for which she cites Bronkhorst 2007.

Buddhism
According to the Pali Buddhist Canon, the Buddha prior to his enlightenment practiced a meditative technique which involved pressing the palate with the tongue and forcibly attempting to restrain the breath. This is described as both extremely painful and not conducive to enlightenment.  In some Buddhist teachings or metaphors, breathing is said to stop with the fourth jhana, though this is a side-effect of the technique and does not come about as the result of purposeful effort.

The Buddha did incorporate moderate modulation of the length of breath as part of the preliminary tetrad in the Anapanasati Sutta. Its use there is preparation for concentration. According to commentarial literature, this is appropriate for beginners.

Indo-Tibetan tradition
Later Indo-Tibetan developments in Buddhist pranayama which are similar to Hindu forms can be seen as early as the 11th century, in the Buddhist text titled the Amṛtasiddhi, which teaches three bandhas in connection with yogic breathing (kumbakha).

Tibetan Buddhist breathing exercises such as the "nine breathings of purification" or the "Ninefold Expulsion of Stale Vital Energy" (rlung ro dgu shrugs), a form of alternate nostril breathing, commonly include visualizations. In the Nyingma tradition of Dzogchen these practices are collected in the textual cycle known as "The Oral Transmission of Vairotsana" (Vai ro snyan brgyud).

Effects

A Cochrane systematic review on the symptomatic relief of mild to moderate asthma by breathing exercises stated that there was limited evidence they might bring about improvement in quality of life, hyperventilation symptoms, and lung function.

Although relatively safe, Hatha Yoga is not risk free. Beginners should avoid advanced moves and exercise within their capabilities. Functional limitations should be taken into consideration. According to at least one study, pranayama was the yoga practice leading to most injuries, with four injuries in a study of 76 practitioners. There have been limited reports of adverse effects including haematoma and pneumothorax, though the connections are not always well established.

See also
 Pranahuti
Xingqi (circulating breath)

References

Sources
 
 
 
 
 
 Zaccaro, Andrea et al. (2018). How Breath-Control Can Change Your Life: A Systematic Review on Psycho-Physiological Correlates of Slow Breathing. Frontiers in Human Neuroscience.
 Benefits and Power of Pranayama – Kaivalyadhama

 
Mind–body interventions
Physical exercise
Hatha yoga
Spiritual practice
Eight limbs of yoga
Meditation